Acestrorhynchus nasutus is a species of fish in the family Acestrorhynchidae. It was described by Carl H. Eigenmann in 1912. It inhabits the Orinoco and Amazon Rivers, as well as rivers in Guyana.

References

Acestrorhynchidae
Taxa named by Carl H. Eigenmann
Fish described in 1912